Flirt Rocks are two small, uninhabited, rocky islets off of Anguilla, in the Leeward Islands of the Caribbean. Seal Reef is situated east of the Flirt Rocks.

The islets consist of the Great and Little Flirt Rocks.

References

Uninhabited islands of Anguilla